Sean Patrick Downey (born 10 July 1990) is a former professional road racing cyclist from Dromore, County Down, Northern Ireland. He won a Bronze medal in the 2010 Commonwealth Games in the team pursuit as part of the Northern Ireland team.

He rode for the  team between 2012 and 2015.

Major results

2007
 1st  National Junior Time Trial Championships
 3rd National Junior Road Race Championships
2008
 1st  National Junior Time Trial Championships
2009
 1st  National Under-23 Road Race Championships
2010
 3rd Team pursuit, Commonwealth Games
2011
 1st  National Under-23 Time Trial Championships
2012
 2nd National Under-23 Road Race Championships
 2nd National Under-23 Time Trial Championships
 8th Overall Kreiz Breizh Elites
2013
 5th Circuit de Wallonie
2014
 2nd National Road Race Championships
 6th Overall Rás Tailteann

References

Cyclists from Northern Ireland
Living people
1990 births
Commonwealth Games medallists in cycling
Commonwealth Games bronze medallists for Northern Ireland
Cyclists at the 2010 Commonwealth Games
European Games competitors for Ireland
Cyclists at the 2015 European Games
Medallists at the 2010 Commonwealth Games